Keith W. Goehner (born 1952) is an American farmer, former educator, and politician from Washington. Goehner is a Republican member of the Washington House of Representatives.

Education 
Goehner attended Wenatachee Valley College. Goehner earned a Bachelor of Arts degree in Education from Seattle Pacific University.

Career 
Goehner is a former elementary school teacher.

As a fruit farmer, Goehner is a pear grower in the Dryden area in Washington. Goehner is a third-generation orchardist. Goehner is the President of K&L Orchards Inc.

From 2003 to 2019, Goehner served as the County Commissioner for Chelan County. Goehner served 4 terms.

Goehner was elected to the state legislature in 2018, running against independent candidate Ann Diamond.

Goehner represents the 12th Legislative District, which includes Chelan, Douglas, Okanogan, and Grant counties.

Awards 
 2020 Guardians of Small Business. Presented by NFIB.

Personal life 
Goehner's wife is Lisa Goehner. They have three children. Goehner and his family live in Dryden, Washington.

References

External links 
 Legislative Manual 2021-2022
 Keith Goehner at ballotpedia.org
 Keith Goehner at washingtonvotes.org
 Keith Goehner at goodfruit.com

Farmers from Washington (state)
Republican Party members of the Washington House of Representatives
21st-century American politicians
Living people
1952 births